Wu Ji may refer to:

Wu Ji (Fengshen Bang), a fictional character in the novel Fengshen Bang
The Promise (2005 film), Chinese title Wu Ji, a 2005 film
 Wu Ji (athlete) (born 1978), Chinese triple jumper

See also
 Wuji (disambiguation)